Aranthangi Nisha (born 12 October 1983) is an Indian actress and comedian who predominantly works in Tamil film and television. She is known for appearing in films such as Maari 2 (2018), Aan Devathai and Thiruchitrambalam (2022). She has also performed in more than 800 stage shows as a comedian.She is fondly called as Chinnathirai Nayantara.

She has appeared in several different television shows such as Kalakka Povathu Yaaru (2015), Sagala vs Ragala  (2018), Kalakka Povathu Yaaru Champions (2018), Ramar Veedu (2019), Mr And Mrs Chinnathirai (season 1)  (2019), Cooku With Comali  (2019-2020), Bigg Boss Tamil (season 4) (2020), BB Jodiagl (season 1)  (2021), Comedy Raja Kalakkal Rani  (2021), Star Kids  (2021),  Bharathi Kannamma (2021), Mr And Mrs Chinnathirai (season 4) (2022) and Vijay Sabhai (2022).

Early life
Aranthangi Nisha was born on 12th October 1983 in Aranthangi, Pudukottai, Tamil Nadu. She is of Tamil descent and belongs to a Muslim family. She loves to act and do comedy in her school days and childhood period.

Career
Aranthangi Nisha made her television debut in 2015 on the Vijay TV's' comedy reality show Kalakka Povathu Yaaru as contestant, she successfully emerged as the 1st runner up of the show and received positive feedbacks for her talent in the show. After her appearance in the show she started to appear in films. She made her debut in the film Maari 2 in 2018  alongside actors Dhanush and Sai Pallavi playing the role as Attu Aanandi which received a overall positive reviews from critics and viewers who praised Nisha for her role in the film. She later appeared in various different films such as Irumbu Thirai (2018), Kolamaavu Kokila (2018) and Seemaraja (2018). She later returned to television hosted a various amount of shows such as Mr And Mrs Chinnathirai (season 1) in 2019 and Cooku with Comali in 2020. Later in 2020 she appeared in the reality show Bigg Boss Tamil (season 4) as a contestant and was later evicted from the show on the 70th day. After her Bigg Boss experience she returned to films and acted in films like Hostel (2022), Thiruchitrambalam (2022) and Trigger (2022).

She is set to appear in a currently untitled film directed by Vasanthabalan, alongside actors Arjun Das and Dushara Vijayan. The film is currently undergoing filming and is set to release in early 2023. Starring Nisha as a supporting role in the film.

Filmography

Films

Television

Awards

References

External links 
 

Actresses in Tamil television
21st-century Indian actresses
Indian film actresses
Bigg Boss (Tamil TV series) contestants
Actresses in Tamil cinema
Tamil actresses
Living people
1983 births
Tamil comedians
Indian women comedians